Seneca cigarettes are a brand of cigarettes manufactured by Grand River Enterprises in Six Nations, Ontario, Canada. Seneca Cigarettes come in a variety of flavors, such as regular, menthol, menthol smooth, lights, ultra lights, non-filters, and a variety of options from kings to 100s, and a 120-size line. The logo contains a mountain range and a Seneca male with a Gustoweh headdress, which reflects traditional Seneca Culture.

In August 2010, the Seneca Free Trade association won an injunction allowing them to continue postal deliveries of purchased cigarettes (the March 2010 Prevent All Cigarette Trafficking Act had previously legislated against such trade).

In May 2013, Seneca also announced and introduced a disposable E-cig line featuring three flavors, regular, menthol, and bold.

See also
 Smoking culture

References

Cigarette brands